Italy will compete at the 2022 European Athletics Championships in Munich, Germany, from 15 to 21 August 2022.

Medals

Finalists
Italy national athletics team in the EAA placing table (rank obtained by assigning eight points in the first place and so on to the eight finalists). It is the best placing ever by an Italian team.

Team
On 3 August 2022, the technical commissioner of the Italian national team Antonio La Torre issued the list of the athletes called up for the Munich European Championships, 101 athletes (54 men and 47 women).

This is the list of selected athletes. It should be considered that the athletes not registered in the individual sprint event could only be reserve in the relay race and therefore will not participate in the continental competition. Just as some athletes still injured shortly before the start of the competition may not participate, such as 100 m Olympic champion Marcell Jacobs.

On 11 August, just four days before the start of the competition, three Italian athletes were forced to give up for their injury.

Legend

Men 
Women

See also
 Italy national athletics team
 Italy at the 2022 World Athletics Championships
 Italy at the 2022 European Championships

Notes

References

External links
 EAA official site 

Italy at the European Athletics Championships
European Athletics Championships
Nations at the 2022 European Athletics Championships